Mariona Gallifa Puigdesens (born 28 January 1982) is a Spanish former professional tennis player.

Gallifa Puigdesens, who had a best ranking of 399 in the world, qualified for her only WTA Tour main draw at the 2002 Tashkent Open, where she was beaten in the first round by second seed Tatiana Poutchek.

ITF finals

Doubles: 2 (0–2)

References

External links
 
 

1982 births
Living people
Spanish female tennis players